José Ignacio Pallas Martínez (born 5 January 1983) is a Uruguayan football manager and former player who played as a centre back. He is the current manager of La Luz.

Career

Club career
In 2003, he began his career playing for River Plate from Montevideo. After two years with the darseneros, he was acquired by Uruguayan powerhouse Club Nacional de Football, where he played over the next to years. 

In 2007, Pallas joined the Mexican team Correcaminos UAT from the second division. After 2 years in that club, Pallas moved to Veracruz another Mexican team from the Liga de Ascenso.

In January 2010 he decided to return to his native country to play for Racing Club de Montevideo. Racing made a good campaign at the Copa Libertadores 2010, where Pallas scored 1 goal. In August 2010 he moved again to join Danubio.

References

External links
 

1983 births
Living people
Footballers from Montevideo
Uruguayan footballers
Uruguayan expatriate footballers
Association football defenders
Uruguayan Primera División players
Paraguayan Primera División players
Ascenso MX players
Liga MX players
Club Atlético River Plate (Montevideo) players
Club Nacional de Football players
C.D. Veracruz footballers
Danubio F.C. players
Centro Atlético Fénix players
Correcaminos UAT footballers
Racing Club de Montevideo players
Cerro Porteño players
Club Puebla players
Uruguayan expatriate sportspeople in Mexico
Uruguayan expatriate sportspeople in Paraguay
Expatriate footballers in Mexico
Expatriate footballers in Paraguay
Uruguayan football managers
Uruguayan Primera División managers
Centro Atlético Fénix managers
La Luz F.C. managers